Ruud Swinkels (born 23 February 1987) is a Dutch professional footballer who plays as a goalkeeper for Esperanza Pelt in the Belgian fifth-tier Belgian Division 3. He formerly played  for FC Eindhoven, PSV, SC Cambuur, Willem II and Witgoor Sport Dessel.

Career
Swinkels started his professional career with FC Eindhoven in the Dutch Eerste Divisie, where he was the first goalkeeper for three years. In the summer of 2012, Swinkels moved to PSV, where he was the third goalkeeper. He was released on 31 December 2012. In June 2013, Swinkels signed for two seasons with SC Cambuur, which promoted to the Eredivisie. However, Cambuur and Swinkels agreed to dissolve his contract with the club on 12 August 2013. Swinkels lost the competition of fellow goalkeeper Leonard Nienhuis and refused to spend the season as the second goalkeeper.

On 30 July 2021, he joined Belgian club Esperanza Pelt.

Honours

Club
Willem II
Eerste Divisie (1): 2013–14

References

External links
 

1987 births
People from Oisterwijk
Living people
Dutch footballers
Association football goalkeepers
FC Eindhoven players
PSV Eindhoven players
SC Cambuur players
Willem II (football club) players
Eredivisie players
Eerste Divisie players
Dutch expatriate footballers
Expatriate footballers in Belgium
Dutch expatriate sportspeople in Belgium
Footballers from North Brabant